The Browning BAR is a gas-operated, semi-automatic rifle produced by the Browning Arms Company in Belgium. The rifle loads from a detachable box magazine. Browning introduced a redesigned BAR in 1966.

Variants
There are several models of the Browning BAR; Safari, Long- and ShortTrac, and Lightweight Stalker. Both LongTrac and ShortTrac versions are available in a Mossy Oak takedown, basic, and Stalker variant.

The Safari model has an engraved steel receiver and walnut stock. The Safari is the only model with the Browning BOSS (Ballistic Optimizing Shooting System). The system reduces recoil and enhances accuracy with an adjustable muzzle brake and weight.

The Lightweight Stalker model has an aluminum-alloy receiver. The stock is matte black synthetic instead of a walnut stock. The stalker is the only model to feature iron sights.

LongTrac and ShortTrac models feature an aluminum-alloy receiver, a plastic trigger guard and floorplate, and more stylised stock. The basic version has a walnut stock; the Stalker version has a matte-black finish and a black composite stock. The Mossy Oak version has a composite stock, and the entire rifle is painted in camouflage colors. Long or Short differ on the action length, and the ShortTrac (BAR ST) can accommodate cartridge lengths up to .308 Winchester, while LongTrac (BAR LT) can accommodate longer cartridges. Since the MK3 update, all BAR rifles have the same long action length, while for instance older BAR versions in .308 have a ShortTrac action up to and including .308 Win.

References

External links
 Browning BAR Owners Manual
 A Brief History of the BAR 

Semi-automatic rifles
Hunting rifles